Jabri may refer to:
 Jabri, Bushehr
 Jabri, Hormozgan